Francis the Smuggler is a 1953 Italian drama film directed by Gianfranco Parolini and starring Roberto Mauri, Doris Duranti and Vira Silenti.

Synopsis
With the police on his trail, a smuggler leaves town for a while. When he returns he falls in love with his boss' daughter, leading to an attempt to kill him.

Cast
 Roberto Mauri as François
 Doris Duranti as Laila
 Vira Silenti as Silvia, figlia del conte
 Luigi Tosi as Topo
Roberto Risso as Davide
 Peter Trent as Conte Paolo di Ronni
 Paola Borboni as Pamela, la governante
 Amedeo Trilli as Professore
 Gianna Baragli as Prostituta al bar del porto
 Manuel Serrano as Spagnolo
 Luigi Bracale as Faina
 Yami Kamadeva as Johnny
 Isarco Ravaioli as Marinaio al bar
 Arnaldo Arnaldi
 Ugo Urbino
 Mercello Jannone
 Raimondo Pennacchoni

References

Bibliography
 Cristina Bragaglia. Il piacere del racconto: narrativa italiana e cinema, 1895–1990. Nuova Italia, 1993.

External links

1953 films
1950s Italian-language films
Films directed by Gianfranco Parolini
1953 drama films
Italian drama films
Italian black-and-white films
1950s Italian films